María Carolina Arregui Vuskovic (born August 26, 1965) is a Chilean television actress of Croatian and Basque descent. Although she never attended drama school, she is considered to be one of Chile's most popular and gifted actresses.

Biography

She debuted at age 17 in the telenovela El Juego de la Vida. Since this work, she started her TV career obtaining some roles, as in Los Títeres, La Torre 10 and especially Ángel Malo, which is considered as her breakthrough role.

In 1993, Arregui left her acting career for personal reasons, within a turmoil of controversy regarding her own marriage to Chilean TV director, Oscar Rodríguez. She returned in 1998, portraying Verónica Retamales in A Todo Dar. For this role, she won the APES (Asociación de Periodistas de Espectáculos) award for Best Actress.

In 2002, Carolina returned to Canal 13, her legendary TV station, in Buen Partido. The same year, she acted in the comedy play Entre Brujas, starring along fellow actresses Rosita Nicolet, Liliana García, Tichi Lobos and Loreto Valenzuela.

In 2003 she was cast in Machos as Sonia, one of the lead characters. Machos was a great success, becoming the telenovela with the highest rating in Chilean television that year. In 2005, she portrayed Beatriz in Brujas as a sexy and overwhelming woman. In 2008, she played Maira Acevedo in Don Amor, filmed in Puerto Rico and broadcast in both the island and in Chile. In 2009, Arregui played the character of Anita Rojas in Cuenta Conmigo.

In 2010, Arregui was crowned as queen of the 2010 Viña del Mar International Song Festival, voted by the media covering the event.

Filmography

Television
 El Juego de la Vida (TVN, 1983)
 La Torre 10 (TVN, 1984) - Gabriela Ugalde
 Los títeres (Canal 13, 1984) - Gloria Leyton
 Ángel Malo (Canal 13, 1986) - Nice Oyarzo (lead character)
 La Última Cruz (Canal 13, 1987) - Kim Kazar
 Semidiós (Canal 13, 1988) - Adriana Lemus
 Te Conté (Canal 13, 1990) - Gianna
 Villa Nápoli (Canal 13, 1991) - Olivia Reyes
 El Palo al Gato (Canal 13, 1992) - Marilí Rojas
 Marrón Glacé (Canal 13, 1993) - Vanessa Aguilera (lead character)
 A Todo Dar (Mega, 1998) - Verónica Retamales
 Algo Está Cambiando (Mega, 1999) - Marta Echeverría (antagonist)
 La Otra Cara del Espejo (Mega, 2000)
 Buen Partido (Canal 13, 2002) - Milagros Cienfuegos (lead character)
 Machos (Canal 13, 2003) - Sonia Trujillo (lead character)
 Hippie (Canal 13, 2004) - Victoria Vicuña
 Brujas (Canal 13, 2005) - Beatriz González (lead character)
 Descarado (Canal 13, 2006) - Amanda Cortés / A-7 (lead character, antagonist)
 Don Amor (Canal 13, 2008) - Maira Acevedo (lead character)
 Cuenta Conmigo (Canal 13, 2009) - Anita María Rojas (lead character)
 Feroz (TV series) (Canal 13, 2010) - Carmen Ramírez (lead character)
 Primera dama (Canal 13, 2010) - Estrella Soto (lead character)
 Peleles (Canal 13, 2011) - Andrea Barahona
 Pobre Rico (TVN, 2012) - Eloísa Rivas
 Somos Los Carmona (TVN, 2013) - Rosa Leiva
 No Abras La Puerta (TVN, 2014) - Gladys
 Caleta del sol (TVN, 2014) - Elena Aranguiz (lead character)
 El Camionero, (TVN, 2016) - Vilma Flores

Theatre
 Entre Brujas (2002)

References

External links
 Official Site (Spanish)
 
 Russian fansite

1965 births
20th-century Chilean actresses
Chilean television actresses
Chilean telenovela actresses
Chilean television presenters
Chilean people of Croatian descent
Chilean people of Basque descent
Living people
Actresses from Santiago
21st-century Chilean actresses
Chilean women television presenters
Chilean television personalities